Hôn Đức Công may refer to:
 Dương Nhật Lễ, emperor of Đại Việt from 1369 to 1370 during the Trần Dynasty
 Lê Duy Phường, emperor of Đại Việt from 1729 to 1732 during the Later Lê Dynasty